The Lattengebirge, also sometimes called the Latten Mountains, are a mountain range up to  in the county of Berchtesgadener Land in the German state of Bavaria. They form a subgroup of the Berchtesgaden Alps and forms the northern end of its parent range.

Geography

Location 
The Lattengebirge lie northeast of the Reiteralm, from which they are separated by the mountain pass of Schwarzbachwacht, and west of the Untersberg, from which they are separated by the Hallthurm Pass. They are located within the municipalities of Ramsau, Bischofswiesen, Bayerisch Gmain, Bad Reichenhall and Schneizlreuth, as well as the former unparished areas (now parishes of the respective municipalities of) Forst Taubensee (Ramsau), Forst St. Zeno (Bayerisch Gmain, Bad Reichenhall und Schneizlreuth) and Bischofswiesener Forst (Bischofswiesen), and they are also within the Berchtesgaden Biosphere Reserve. The Saalach, a southwestern tributary of the Salzach, flows past the Lattengebirge to the northwest running in a southwest to northeast direction.

Peaks 
The highest peak of the Lattengebirge is the Karkopf (1,738 m). Important touring summits are the Predigtstuhl (1,613 m) with its mountain hotel, the Dreisesselberg (1,680 m) and the Dötzenkopf (1,001 m).

Topography and geology 

The Lattengebirge consist mainly of Dachstein limestone and Ramsau dolomite, the dolomite containing various proportions of magnesium. Because the rocks have weathered unevenly, bizarre formations have been created in the Lattengebirge; these include Steinerne Agnes ("Stony Agnes", ca. 1,400 m), the rugged crags below the Predigtstuhl Cable Car and the striking formation of the Rotofen pinnacles at the eastern end of the Lattengebirge. These are known
locally as the Schlafende Hexe (the "Sleeping Witch") or Montgelas-Nase ("Montgelas' Nose"). Less well known is the roughly 1,585 m Teufelsloch ("Devil's Bowl"). This is a roughly 5-metre-long natural rock arch with a diameter of around 2.5 metres and lies in a hillock-like eminences on the southeastern rocky ridge between the Schlafende Hexe and the Alpgarten.

Tourism and development 
From Bad Reichenhall visitors can take the Predigtstuhl Cable Car to the mountain hotel on the Predigtstuhl. The cable car dates to 1928 and is the oldest surviving original large cabin cable car in the world. In addition the Lattengebirge are home to ski areas of Hochschwarzeck near Ramsau and Götschen near Bischofswiesen-Loipl.

References

External links 

 The Teufelsloch in the Lattengebirge

Mountain ranges of the Alps
Mountain ranges of Bavaria
Berchtesgaden Alps
Berchtesgadener Land